Bocchoris is a genus of moths of the family Crambidae described by Frederic Moore in 1885.

Species
Bocchoris adalis Walker, 1859
Bocchoris albinalis Hampson, 1912
Bocchoris albipunctalis Shibuya, 1929
Bocchoris amandalis C. Swinhoe, 1903 (Thailand)
Bocchoris aptalis (Walker, [1866]) (Japan and Indonesia)
Bocchoris borbonensis Guillermet in Viette & Guillermet, 1996 (Reunion)
Bocchoris chalcidiscalis Hampson, 1898 (Brazil)
Bocchoris darsanalis (Druce, 1895)
Bocchoris gallienalis (Viette, 1958) (from Madagascar)
Bocchoris graphitalis (Snellen, 1875)
Bocchoris incoalis Schaus, 1920
Bocchoris inductalis (Walker, 1865)
Bocchoris inspersalis (Zeller, 1852)
Bocchoris insulalis Hampson, 1912
Bocchoris isakalis Viette, 1954 (Madagascar)
Bocchoris junctifascialis Hampson, 1898 (from Indonesia)
Bocchoris labarinthalis Hampson, 1912 (from Congo and Nigeria)
Bocchoris lumaralis Holland, 1900 (from Indonesia)
Bocchoris manuselalis Rothschild, 1915 (from Indonesia)
Bocchoris marucalis (Druce, 1895) (from Costa Rica)
Bocchoris nuclealis de Joannis, 1927 (Mozambique)
Bocchoris placitalis Schaus, 1912 (from Costa Rica)
Bocchoris pulverealis Hampson, 1898 (Java)
Bocchoris rufiflavalis Hampson, 1912 (from Madagascar)
Bocchoris telphusalis (Walker, 1859) (from Borneo and India)
Bocchoris tenera Butler, 1883 (from southern Asia)
Bocchoris trimaculalis (Snellen, 1880)
Bocchoris triumphalis (C. Felder, R. Felder & Rogenhofer, 1875)
Bocchoris trivitralis C. Swinhoe, 1895 (from India)

Former species
Bocchoris acamalis (Walker)
Bocchoris amphipeda (Meyrick, 1939)
Bocchoris approprialis Dyar, 1914
Bocchoris artificalis (Lederer, 1863)
Bocchoris danalis Hampson, 1893
Bocchoris densalis Dyar, 1914
Bocchoris differentialis Dyar, 1914
Bocchoris edaphodrepta Dyar, 1914
Bocchoris gueyraudi (Guillermet, 2003)
Bocchoris hohaelis Dyar, 1914
Bocchoris incisalis Snellen, 1880
Bocchoris insipidalis (Lederer, 1863)
Bocchoris invidiosa Dyar, 1914
Bocchoris nacobora Dyar, 1914
Bocchoris onychinalis (Guenée, 1854)
Bocchoris rhehabalis Dyar, 1914
Bocchoris rotundalis Hampson, 1893
Bocchoris sparsalis Dyar, 1914
Bocchoris terealis Walker, 1859

References

Spilomelinae
Crambidae genera
Taxa named by Frederic Moore